Artem Pustovyi (born June 25, 1992) is a Ukrainian professional basketball player for UCAM Murcia in the Spanish league. He also represents the Ukrainian national team.

Professional career

Ukraine
Pustovyi started his professional basketball career for BC Khimik (Yuzhne, Ukraine) in 2009. 

In season 2014-15 of the Ukrainian Basketball Superleague he averaged 10.5 points and 4.8 rebounds per game and BC Khimik won the championship. Despite such success, Pustovyi decided to leave the SuperLeague of Ukraine and continue his professional basketball career abroad.

Spain
On June 18, 2015 he signed with Spanish club Obradoiro CAB of the Liga ACB. 

In 28 games of the Liga ACB in season 2015-16 Ukrainian center averaged 3.9 points and 2.6 rebounds per game. 

The next 2016-17 season Pustovyi significantly improved his skills. In 31 games for Obradoiro CAB of the Spanish Basketball League he averaged 9.5 points and 3.4 rebounds per game.

After that season he made a decision to extend the contract with the Spanish club.

On July 2, 2021, he has signed with Herbalife Gran Canaria of the Spanish Liga ACB.

On July 8, 2022, Gran Canaria released Pustovyi.

On July 17, 2022, he has signed with UCAM Murcia in the Spanish league.

National team career
Pustovyi played for Ukraine's Under-20 team during the FIBA Europe U-20 Championship in 2011 and 2012.

In 2011 he averaged 9.4 points and 2.8 rebounds per game and in 2012 it was 14.9 points and 6 rebounds per game.

His debut for the Ukraine national basketball team was in 2013 at the EuroBasket 2013 in Slovenia. He also played at EuroBasket 2015,  2014 FIBA Basketball World Cup. and EuroBasket 2017.

The most successful performance for the national team of Ukraine at this time is considered to be his play at the European Basketball Championship 2017. Pustovyi averaged 22.5 minutes on the court with 15.3 points and 6.5 rebounds per game. He ranks 9th place in the Efficiency rating among all players of EuroBasket 2017 and 5th place among the centers.

References

External links
Artem Pustovyi at acb.com 

1992 births
Living people
2014 FIBA Basketball World Cup players
Basketball players from Kyiv
BC Khimik players
CB Gran Canaria players
Centers (basketball)
FC Barcelona Bàsquet players
Liga ACB players
Obradoiro CAB players
Ukrainian expatriate basketball people in Spain
Ukrainian men's basketball players